The Lázaro Galdiano Museum (Spanish: Museo Lázaro Galdiano) is a museum located in Madrid, Spain.  It houses the art collection of José Lázaro Galdiano. The museum was inaugurated on 27 January 1951.

History 
The palatial building was constructed in 1903 as the residence of Lázaro Galdiano and his wife and is set within grounds that also hold the library containing Galdiano's important collection of incunabula and manuscripts. The conversion to a museum has respected the original interiors, which feature elaborate baroque painted ceilings commissioned by Galdiano, 

As he died in 1947, Galdiano bequeathed his entire personal collection of over 12,000 items to the Spanish State.

The building was declared Bien de Interés Cultural in 1962.

Collection 
The museum contains important collections of valuable works from the prehistoric period to the nineteenth century, with a focus on Iberian work.  Major categories include jewellery, small bronzes, both ecclesiastical and domestic silver, ceramics, carved ivory, and numismatics.  Objects come not only from Iberia but also from major centers of medieval artistry, including Limoges and Egypt. While the Renaissance is especially well represented, the collection features important early medieval objects, including Visigothic work, and works crafted by Iberia's ancient Celtic culture.

Painting collection 
The painting collection includes work by artists such as George Romney, John Constable (Landscape of Flatford), Nicolaes Maes (one female portrait), David Teniers the Younger,  Erasmus Quellinus II (The Virgin and the Child), Giulio Clovio (one miniature on vellum),  Bernardo Cavallino (St. Stephen), Lorenzo Tiepolo, Joshua Reynolds, Francisco Zurbarán, Lucas Cranach the Elder, Hieronymus Bosch, Diego de Velázquez, Francisco de Goya, Bartolomé Esteban Murillo, Luis Paret, El Greco and Federico de Madrazo.

References

External links 
 Official website of the Fundación Lázaro Galdiano
Virtual tour of the Lázaro Galdiano Museum provided by Google Arts & Culture

Art collections in Spain
Art museums and galleries in Madrid
Bien de Interés Cultural landmarks in Madrid
Former private collections
Buildings and structures in Salamanca District, Madrid